Klarna Bank AB, commonly referred to as Klarna, is a Swedish fintech company that provides online financial services such as payments for online storefronts and direct payments along with post-purchase payments.

The company has more than 5,000 employees, most of them working at the headquarters in Stockholm and Berlin. In 2021, the company handled about US$80 billion in online sales. As of 2011, about 40% of all e-commerce sales in Sweden went through Klarna. In 2021, the company was Europe's most valuable private tech company, at a $45.6 billion valuation, however this crashed to $6.7 billion in 2022.

Klarna's core service is to provide payment processing services for the e-commerce industry, managing store claims and customer payments. It has become known as a "Buy now, pay later" (BNPL) service provider, offering customers credit on their purchases as part of the checkout process.

History 
The three founders Sebastian Siemiatkowski, Niklas Adalberth and Victor Jacobsson participated in the Stockholm School of Economics annual entrepreneurship award in 2005 with their idea, however their idea was not enthusiastically received and their entry was among the last in the competition.

Despite this, they decided to found Klarna in mid-2005 and started operations in Sweden. An angel investor and previous Erlang Systems sales manager, Jane Walerud, invested in their company and put them in contact with a team of programmers to help them build the platform.

At the end of 2007, venture capital firm Investment AB Öresund invested in the company. Three years later, Klarna started selling their services in Norway, Finland and Denmark. Klarna also started their operations in Germany and the Netherlands in 2010, and in May the same year, San Francisco-based Sequoia Capital entered as investors. During 2010, Klarna increased their revenues by over 80% to US$54 million (~400 million SEK). In the early 2011, British newspaper The Telegraph listed Klarna as one of Europe's 100 most promising young tech companies.

In 2011, growth equity firm General Atlantic led a $155 million investment round joined by DST Global, and General Atlantic's managing director Anton Levy joined the board of directors. In May 2011, Klarna acquired Israeli company Analyzd, which had business activity on markets in Europe, Israel and the United States. Analyzd specialise in risk management and online payments, and its founders previously worked for PayPal.

Klarna began offering services in Austria in 2012, and in 2013, Klarna and German SOFORT AG merged after Klarna acquired SOFORT Banking from the majority shareholder Reimann Investors, becoming Klarna Group. Both companies would continue to offer their products side by side and operate on a stand-alone basis.

Klarna launched in the United States in September 2015, and the US has become its principal focus for future growth, after securing exclusive partnerships with luxury department store Macy's.  That year, Minister of Enterprise and Innovation Mikael Damberg dubbed Klarna one of Sweden's "five unicorns", by which he meant startup companies that had succeeded in growing and attracting international investments. The other four companies were Spotify, Mojang, Skype, and King.

In 2019, Klarna raised $460 million with plans to expand payment presence in the US, with participation from Dragoneer Investment Group, Commonwealth Bank of Australia, HMI Capital, Merian Chysalis Investment Company Limited and others. This funding round valued the company at $5.5 billion, becoming the largest fintech start-up in Europe. In 2020, Klarna acquired Nuji.

In 2020, Ant Financial, the payment affiliate of Chinese e-commerce company Alibaba, invested in Klarna as part of a global partnership between the two firms.

In February 2021, Klarna launched bank accounts for a limited number of users in Germany. Customers received a full-fledged bank account along with a German IBAN and a Visa debit card.

In June 2021, Klarna raised $639 million in a fundraising round led by SoftBank Group's Vision Fund 2, taking the company's valuation to $45.6 billion.

In November 2021, Klarna launched to U.S. consumers a "Pay Now" service to pay immediately and in full to any online retailer that supports Klarna. They also launched the Klarna card, which enabled interest-free payments in physical card format, either in stores or online.

In January 2022, Klarna launched a physical card in the UK allowing customers to shop anywhere accepting Visa card payment. The card has a wait list of 400,000 and will see firm square up to the credit card as a payment method for merchants not already on the platform.

In March 2022, Klarna announced the completion of its acquisition of the comparison shopping service company, PriceRunner.

In May 2022, Klarna's CEO announced the layoff of roughly 10% of the workforce.

In June 2022, Klarna announced a partnership deal with Marqeta to bring physical Visa cards to the US.

In July 2022, Klarna raised $800 million in funding.

In September 2022, Klarna announced a second round of layoffs, affecting around 500 employees.

In October 2022, Klarna launched a new Klarna Creator app for retailers and influencers to collaborate on brand campaigns and to track earnings, performance and sales.

Technology 
Parts of Klarna's code base are written in Erlang, a programming language designed by Ericsson for highly parallel, scalable applications. Node.js is also used extensively at Klarna with Apache Kafka used to communicate between services. Kafka is a core part of Klarna's microservice architecture, with hundreds of services using it to communicate among themselves.

Controversy

Regulation
In the UK, Klarna operates in the rapidly growing post-payment sector which has been criticised for encouraging consumers to get themselves into unserviceable levels of debt. In February 2021, the UK Government announced that this sector would now be subject to regulation from the UK's Financial Conduct Authority.

In Sweden a large number of complaints regarding Klarna were sent to the Swedish Consumer Agency in 2014. Many customers had received reminder fees and threats about debt collection without having received a proper invoice. It was speculated if this was an unethical business model since the company made money on these reminder fees and Klarna also had a subsidiary dedicated to debt collection. The Swedish Consumer Agency also found a reason to investigate how Klarna added credit fees for partial payments. The year before the co-founder Niklas Adalberth said in a presentation during the startup conference Arctic15 that: "That is one of our revenue streams so actually the best customer is the one that doesn't pay directly but actually get a reminder and then also debt collection because we are able to add the legal fees."

In Germany, the District Court of Bremerhaven ruled in 2022 that Klarna cannot demand a flat rate of €1.20 for a reminder by e-mail because Klarna had not submitted any corresponding costs.

Privacy 
In February 2020, Der Spiegel reported that Klarna's autofill feature allows anyone to extract personal information, such as phone number, postal address and date of birth, only based on the email address and postal code of a customer.

In October 2020, Klarna mistakenly sent a marketing email to people that were unaware of ever doing business with the company.

In May 2021, Klarna exposed the accounts of its users randomly to any user. Klarna stated the problem was due to a severe technical issue.

Klarna has been used to commit identity theft and fraud. The company claims that its fraud checks and controls are no more lax than that of banks.

In March 2022, the Swedish Authority for Privacy Protection (Integritetsskyddsmyndigheten) fined Klarna  for inadequacies in its privacy notice and handling of personal data. Klarna stated in return it would appeal the decision, citing finding the decision ambiguous and finding it unclear why the information provided in the notice was deemed inadequate, as well as through appealing hoping for further clarification on the guidelines.

See also 

 Boursorama
 Wise
 N26
 Revolut

References 

Financial services companies established in 2005
Banks established in 2005
Banks of Sweden
Companies based in Stockholm
Online payments